Microaporia is a genus of flies in the family Tachinidae.

Species
Microaporia elegans Townsend, 1919

Distribution
Peru.

References

Diptera of South America
Exoristinae
Tachinidae genera
Taxa named by Charles Henry Tyler Townsend
Monotypic Brachycera genera